This is the discography of Sloan, a Canadian rock band from Halifax, Nova Scotia.

Studio albums

EPs

Live albums

Compilations

Guest appearances

Singles

References

Discographies of Canadian artists
Rock music group discographies